Serhiy Arshakovych Tatulian (Ukrainian: Сергій Аршакович Татулян, born 3 March 1956 in Gagra, Georgia) is a former Ukrainian professional football referee.

References

External links
 Serhiy Tatulian at allplayers.in.ua

1956 births
Living people
People from Gagra
Ukrainian football referees
National University of Ukraine on Physical Education and Sport alumni